Oklahoma bombing may refer to:

 Oklahoma City bombing
 2005 University of Oklahoma bombing